Kvadraturen is a borough in the city centre of the city of Kristiansand which lies in the municipality of Kristiansand in Agder county, Norway. It has a population of 6,750 (2015). The borough is made up of the centre together with the harbour to the south and the more rural district of "Eg" to the north. Kvadraturen is the administrative centre of the municipality of Kristiansand as well as the administrative centre of Vest-Agder county, but is far smaller in area than the other boroughs in the municipality, such as the borough of Grim to the north and west, and the borough of Lund to the east.

Kvadraturen is the location of the Kristiansand Cathedral and the nearby commercial, pedestrian street is Markens gate.  The city harbour is located along the Kristiansandsfjorden and the island of Odderøya.  The borough has three malls and three high schools. The closest public junior high is "Grim Skole" and the closest elementary is Tordenskjoldsgate Skole and is the only remanding elementary in Kvadraturen.  The Sørlandet Hospital Kristiansand is also located in the borough, in the district of Eg.

The main city centre was established as a city on 5 July 1641 by King Christian IV.  The city became a self-governing municipality under the formannskapsdistrikt law on 1 January 1838.  On 1 July 1921, a neighboring part of the municipality of Oddernes (population: 2,164) was transferred from Oddernes to the city of Kristiansand.  During the 1960s, there were many municipal mergers across Norway due to the work of the Schei Committee. On 1 January 1965, the city of Kristiansand (population: 27,100) was merged with the neighboring municipalities of Randesund (population: 1,672), Oddernes (population: 18,668), and Tveit (population: 2,802) to form a new, larger municipality of Kristiansand.

Shopping
Markens gate is the main pedestrian street in Kristiansand. The street has many different stores. The walking zone stretches over seven blocks. During the 1600-1700s, the street was called Dronningens gate, and today its also nicknamed Stripen (The Strip).

The most central part of the city is lower Markens where it meets Tollbodgata. Some stores here are open 24/7 and it is here most crimes of downtown Kristiansand take place. Chain restaurants like 7-Eleven, McDonald's, and Deli de Luca are also located there.

There are three malls at Kvadraturen: Sandens is the largest and newest one, Slottet Shopping is located at the north end of Markens gate in the north. Lille Markens is the smallest mall.

Transportation
Kristiansand Bus Terminal, Kristiansand Station, and Kristiansand Harbor are all located at Vestre Strandgate next to each other.  Local buses goes from Henrik Wergelandsgate and Tollbodgata.

Kristiansand Station has daily trains to Oslo and Stavanger.  Kristiansand Harbor has many daily ferry routes to Hirtshals, Denmark.

Education
There are two public and one private high schools and one elementary school in the borough of Kvadraturen. The elementary school has students from over 27 different nationalities. The closest junior high schools are in the nearby boroughs of Grim and Lund.

Politics
The largest political parties in Kvadraturen (2019):

Tourism
The borough of Kvadraturen is the site of many tourist attractions.  Christiansholm Fortress was built in 1672.  The Kilden Theatre, the largest culture house and theatre in Southern Norway, is located on the island of Odderøya. It was finished in 2012 and has a capacity of over 2,000.

Fiskebrygga (The Fish Wharf), a former fish landing in Kvadraturen with Odderøya, has been redeveloped as a restaurant, shopping, and tourist destination.

Neighbourhoods

Baneheia
Byskogen
Bystranda
Eg
Fiskebrygga
Kvadraturen nordvest
Kvadraturen nordøst
Kvadraturen sørvest
Kvadraturen sørøst
Lagmannsholmen
Nybyen
Odderøya
Posebyen
Strandpromenaden
Tangen

Media gallery

References

Geography of Kristiansand
Boroughs of Kristiansand
Central business districts
Tourism in Kristiansand